Picramnia parvifolia, the cedrinho, is a tree species that occurs in Brazil (in Cerrado and Atlantic Forest), in the regions Sudeste (in São Paulo and Minas Gerais states) and Sul (Paraná, Santa Catarina and Rio Grande do Sul state), and in Paraguay (in the departments of Guairá and Paraguarí).

References

External links
 Diagnostic illustration of P parvifolia from tropicos.org

Picramniales
Flora of the Atlantic Forest
Flora of the Cerrado
Trees of Brazil
Trees of Paraguay
Flora of Minas Gerais
Flora of Paraná (state)
Flora of Rio Grande do Sul
Flora of Santa Catarina (state)
Flora of São Paulo (state)
Plants described in 1874
Taxa named by George Engelmann